DC Showcase: Adam Strange is an American animated short superhero film based on the character of the same name produced by Warner Bros. Animation and DC Entertainment. It was included as part of the home media release of Justice League Dark: Apokolips War. The film is also part of the "Tomorrowverse" continuity which begun with Superman: Man of Tomorrow, and is followed by Green Lantern: Beware My Power.

Plot
Adam Strange's origin story is presented in flashbacks. On the Planet Rann, a Thanagarian armada invaded and attacked, Strange's Rannian wife Alanna was killed in the missile strike, and he had to fight his way while finding his daughter Aleea. During his search, he was randomly teleported to Eden Corp Mining Colony Number 75 in Space Sector 24601 by a Zeta Beam. He swore he would find his way back to Rann and be reunited with Aleea when the Zeta Beam returns. He determines the Beam's arrival by physics, mathematic and scientific calculations, but days, weeks, months and years go by, and the beam dose not arrive. Vexed, haggard and tired, he gives up and resorts to alcohol and gets into fights with local residents of the colony only for sympathetic The Forman of the mining colony to pull him out of trouble because he too has a wife and daughter. The people of the mining colony face an attack from bug-like aliens that were dwelling underground where the colony was mining. The Forman tries to ask Strange for help, but he is too drunk to do anything, so they leave him in a shelter to be safe. When he sobers up and see the colony under attack, it reminds him of the attack on Rann and he decides to help. After the aliens are all destroyed, the mine is compromised by awareness that there could be more aliens, and all the miners and their families prepare for departure. The Foreman, grateful for Adam Strange saving him and his family during the attack, offers to give Adam a ride but the latter chooses to stay and wait for the inevitable arrival of the Zeta beam. The spaceship leaves and Adam's rocket pack alerts him that the long-waited Zeta Beam has finally arrived, and he can finally continue his quest for his daughter.

Cast
 Charlie Weber as Adam Strange
 Kimberly Brooks as Alanna, Diane, Meyra
 Ray Chase as Noris
 Roger R. Cross as Foreman
 Fred Tatasciore as Bartender

Notes

References

External links
 

2020 animated films
2020 direct-to-video films
2020 films
2020 short films
2020s American animated films
2020s animated superhero films
2020s direct-to-video animated superhero films
2020s Warner Bros. animated short films
DC Showcase
Tomorrowverse